North-East Development Commission is a commission in Nigeria established to rebuild infrastructure and institutions destroyed by Boko Haram in northeast Nigeria. The commission oversees activities in Borno, Adamawa, Bauchi, Taraba, Gombe and Yobe state.

References 

Boko Haram insurgency
Government commissions